

Friedrich-Wilhelm von Rothkirch und Panthen (16 February 1884 – 24 December 1953) was a German general during World War II. He was a recipient of the Knight's Cross of the Iron Cross of Nazi Germany. Rothkirch und Panthen retired from active duty on 30 November 1943.

Awards
 Knight's Cross of the Iron Cross on 15 August 1940 as Generalmajor and commander of the 13th Motorized Infantry Division (13. Infanterie-Division (motorisiert))

References

Citations

Bibliography

 

1884 births
1953 deaths
Lieutenant generals of the German Army (Wehrmacht)
Military personnel from Darmstadt
German Army personnel of World War I
Recipients of the clasp to the Iron Cross, 1st class
Recipients of the Knight's Cross of the Iron Cross
People from the Grand Duchy of Hesse
Prussian Army personnel
Reichswehr personnel